The Przysucha Formation is a geologic formation in Poland. Ichnofossils attributed to dinosaurs have been found in the formation.

Fossil content 
The following fossils were reported from the formation:

Ichnofossils
 Anomoepus pienkovskii
 Grallator (Grallator) zvierzi
 Moyenisauropus karaszevskii
 Anomoepus sp.
 Grallator (Eubrontes) sp.
 Kayentapus sp.
 Protosuchus sp.
 cf. Stenonyx sp.

References

Bibliography 
 
  
 

Geologic formations of Poland
Jurassic System of Europe
Hettangian Stage
Sandstone formations
Mudstone formations
Lagoonal deposits
Ichnofossiliferous formations
Paleontology in Poland